Annona moaensis is a species of plant in the family Annonaceae. It is endemic to Cuba. Frère León and Henri Alain Liogier, the botanists who first formally described the species, named it after Moa, Cuba where the specimen they observed was collected.

Description
It is a bush reaching 2–3 meters in height.  Its branches have white lenticels.  Its leaves are 5-9 by 1-2 centimeters and come to tapering point.  The upper surface of the leaves are glossy, the undersides are lightly covered in wooly hairs.  The leaves have 18-20 secondary veins emanating from its midrib.  Its petioles are 3-6 millimeters long, covered in rust-colored wooly hairs and have a groove on their upper surface. Its flowers are on 1-1.5 centimeter long, black peduncles that are covered in white wooly hairs.  The peduncles have a triangular bract about a third of the way up their length.  The bract is covered with rust-colored wooly hairs. Its calyx has triangular lobes.  It has 3 petals that touch, but are not fused, at their margins.  The petals are 20-25 by 3 millimeters and a bit wider at their base.  The petals reddish on their outer surface and have wooly hairs on both surfaces.  Its round fruit are 2 by 2 centimeters, with a surface covered in small warty projections and gray wooly hairs.

Reproductive biology
The pollen of A. moaensis is shed as permanent tetrads.

Distribution and habitat
It has been observed growing on low coastal hills.

References

External links
 

moaensis
Flora of Cuba
Plants described in 1946
Taxa named by Frère León
Taxa named by Henri Alain Liogier
Flora without expected TNC conservation status